Perla Amanda Muñoz (born 27 February 1974) is a retired Argentine Paralympic athlete who competed in shot put, discus and javelin throwing events at international elite events. She has participated at the Parapan American Games five times consecutively and the Paralympic Games four times.

References

1974 births
Living people
Sportspeople from Bahía Blanca
Paralympic athletes of Argentina
Argentine female shot putters
Argentine female discus throwers
Argentine female javelin throwers
Athletes (track and field) at the 2000 Summer Paralympics
Athletes (track and field) at the 2004 Summer Paralympics
Athletes (track and field) at the 2008 Summer Paralympics
Athletes (track and field) at the 2012 Summer Paralympics
Medalists at the World Para Athletics Championships
Medalists at the 2007 Parapan American Games
Medalists at the 2011 Parapan American Games
21st-century Argentine women